The Take Me Home Tour was the second headlining concert tour by English-Irish boy band One Direction, in support of their second studio album, Take Me Home (2012). The tour began on 23 February 2013 in London, England, and concluded on 3 November 2013 in Chiba, Japan. It was announced by member Liam Payne at the BRIT Awards in early 2012, originally billed as the UK & Ireland Arena Tour. In mid-2012, the tour expanded to include North America and Australia following the band's international breakthrough. The tour was documented in the film One Direction: This Is Us directed by Morgan Spurlock.

The Take Me Home Tour was commercially successful, with many sold-out shows and overwhelming demand for tickets, prompting organisers to add more dates to the itinerary. In the UK and Ireland, ticket sales reached 300,000 within a day of release, which included a six sell-out dates at the O2 Arena in London. In Australia and New Zealand, ticket sales grossed US$15.7 million, with all 190,000 tickets sold for eighteen shows held in Australia and New Zealand. The tour placed at number 10 on Pollstars Year-End Top 20 Worldwide Tours list, grossing $114 million from the 123 shows.

Background

On 21 February 2012, One Direction attended the 2012 BRIT Awards at which they received the Best British Single award for their debut single "What Makes You Beautiful". During One Direction's acceptance speech, member Liam Payne stated that they would embark on their first arena concert tour. Reports soon followed that the tour would consist of fifteen dates across the UK and Ireland. One Direction's official website confirmed the dates, with tickets to be made available on 25 February.

On 11 January 2013, the group announced the North American leg as a part of a '2013 World Tour'. The North American leg was set to begin a 25-city run in Sunrise, Florida, on 13 June 2013 and to stop in Toronto, Chicago, Denver, Montreal and Las Vegas before wrapping up in Los Angeles on 7 August. Tickets for the North American leg of the concert series went on sale 21 April 2012, at Ticketmaster.com and LiveNation.com. Group member Niall Horan said in a statement released to MTV News, "Our fans are simply the best in the world. The support they have shown us has been incredible and we're all so grateful to each and every one of them. We can't wait to see everyone this summer, at Madison Square Garden and of course when we play our world tour in 2013."

On 18 April 2012, the Australian leg was announced. The leg was set to begin in Brisbane on 13 September 2013 and visit Sydney, Melbourne and Adelaide before heading west to Perth. The tour then returned to the east coast for five additional shows before travelling to New Zealand for three shows. Tickets for the Australasian leg went on sale on 28 April 2012, except for the Perth dates, which went on sale on 28 June.

In June 2012, continental European dates were reported to be in the process of being added and were confirmed on 29 October 2012. The continental European dates compromises of shows in France, Norway, Sweden, Germany, Belgium, the Netherlands, Italy, Spain, Switzerland, Portugal and Denmark in April and May 2013. Tickets went on sale between 2 and 5 November 2012, depending on the venue.

Commercial reception

Having initially announced 15 shows across the UK and Ireland, the group added extra shows around the UK and Ireland due to high demand, which included matinée performances at various dates. One Direction announced the extra shows on their Twitter page throughout the morning after the initial dates went on sale. British ticket sales reached 300,000 within a day of release. The original dates sold out within minutes—with 1,000 tickets selling per minute, with two or three extra dates having been added at each city. Notable dates that sold out include six dates at The O2 Arena in London, while four dates at The O2 in Dublin also sold out within an hour—as did four Belfast Odyssey Arena dates. In North America, the group added additional shows due to "overwhelming demand". The tickets for the added shows went on sale in May 2012. In Australia and New Zealand, tickets also ignited commercial success pulling sales of US$15.7million, with all 190,000 tickets being sold for eighteen shows to be held in Australia and New Zealand from September 2013. Tickets for the Perth shows, which went on sale later than the rest of Australia, sold out in six minutes.

In May 2012, as One Direction added more dates to their 2013 World Tour, Andy Greene, associate editor of Rolling Stone magazine, declared that the boy band are "being worked like dogs". The Daily Star Sunday revealed that many of their shows planned for 2013 had sold out and that they were adding an extra 25 performances in 20 US cities, some of which priced at more than £200 for one ticket. The article additionally noted that "One Direction could eclipse the big tour megabucks earned by rock giants U2 and The Rolling Stones". Greene ultimately declared: "I've never known a band announce a second summer tour before a first summer tour is over. It's insane – they're working them like dogs and printing money right now".

In July 2013, the tour ranked 12th on Pollstars "Top 100 Mid Year Worldwide Tours", earning $49.6 million from 68 shows. The tour ranked 10th Pollstars Year-End Top 20 Worldwide Tours list, grossing $114 million.

On 29 October 2013, it was announced that the band had sold a record-breaking 81,542 tickets at Sydney's Allphones Arena. The previous record was held by Metallica with 74,244. The executives of the arena unveiled the first entertainer's "Star" in the Sydney Olympic Park precinct to commemorate the achievement.

Opening acts
Camryn (Europe)
5 Seconds of Summer (Ireland, United Kingdom, North America, Australia, New Zealand)
Olly Murs (Japan)

Setlist
This set list is representative of the show on 24 February 2013 in London. It is not representative of all concerts for the duration of the tour.

"Up All Night"
"I Would"
"Heart Attack"
"More than This"
"Loved You First"
"One Thing"
"C'mon, C'mon"
"Change My Mind"
"One Way or Another (Teenage Kicks)"
"Last First Kiss"
"Moments"
"Back For You"
"Summer Love"
"Over Again"
"Little Things"
"Teenage Dirtbag" (Wheatus cover)
"Rock Me"
"She's Not Afraid"
"Kiss You"
Encore
"Live While We're Young"
"What Makes You Beautiful"

Tour dates

Festivals and other miscellaneous performances
Matinee and evening concerts
The score data is representative of the seven shows at Rod Laver Arena on 2–3, 16-17, 28–30 October respectively.
The score data is representative of the four shows at Dublin 3Arena on 3,5, 12-13 March respectively.
The score data is representative of the four shows at Motorpoint Arena Sheffield on 19 March, 13-14 April respectively.

Notes 
1.Data from study is collected from all worldwide concerts held between 1 January and 30 June 2013. All monetary figures are based in U.S. dollars. All information is based upon extensive research conducted by Pollstar.

References

External links

Official website

2013 concert tours
One Direction concert tours